Total Football is a football (soccer) videogame developed for the Mega Drive and Amiga programmed by Domark and published by Acclaim in 1995.

References

External links 
 Total Football at GameSpot.com

1995 video games
Amiga games
Sega Genesis games
Association football video games
Domark games
Video games developed in the United Kingdom